Tetrorea cilipes is a species of beetle in the family Cerambycidae. It was described by Adam White in 1846. It is known from New Zealand.
The larvae of T. cilipes are known to make a distinct clicking sound.

References

Desmiphorini
Beetles described in 1846
Beetles of New Zealand
Endemic fauna of New Zealand
Endemic insects of New Zealand